The 32nd European Championships in Men's Artistic Gymnastics Seniors and Juniors was held from 25 to 29 May 2016 at the PostFinance-Arena in Bern, Switzerland.

Senior Results

Team competition

Floor

Pommel horse

Rings

Vault

Parallel bars

Horizontal bar

Schedule

Medalists

Junior Results

Team competition

Individual all-around

Floor

Pommel horse

Rings

Vault

Parallel bars

Horizontal bar

Medal count

Combined

Seniors

Juniors

References

External links
 

European Artistic Gymnastics Championships
European Men's Artistic Gymnastics Championships
Gymnastics
2016 in Swiss sport
Sport in Bern
International gymnastics competitions hosted by Switzerland